FC Schalke 04 had another disappointing season, in which it failed to qualify for the Champions League. New coach Frank Neubarth did not last long, and was sacked and replaced by captain Marc Wilmots in the dugout. Once again, goalscoring was at a premium, with top scorer Victor Agali managing only seven in total. The end result was 7th place in Bundesliga, barely even qualifying for the Intertoto Cup.

Squad

Goalkeepers
  Frank Rost
  Oliver Reck
  Christofer Heimeroth

Defenders
  Marco van Hoogdalem
  Anibal Matellán
  Tomasz Hajto
  Tomasz Wałdoch
  Nico van Kerckhoven
  Fabian Lamotte
  Darío Rodríguez

Midfielders
  Marc Wilmots
  Sven Vermant
  Sérgio Pinto
  Jörg Böhme
  Kristijan Djordjević
  Christian Poulsen
  Mike Büskens
  Filip Trojan
  Niels Oude Kamphuis
  Gustavo Varela
  Andreas Möller

Attackers
  Émile Mpenza
  Victor Agali
  Mike Hanke
  Gerald Asamoah
  Abdul Iyodo
  Ebbe Sand

Competitions

Bundesliga

League table

Matches

 Schalke 04-VfL Wolfsburg 1–0
 1–0 Sven Vermant (88)
 Kaiserslautern-Schalke 04 1–3
 1–0 Thomas Riedl (33)
 1–1 Jörg Böhme (48 pen)
 1–2 Victor Agali (59)
 1–3 Ebbe Sand (90)
 Schalke 04-Hertha BSC 0–0
 Stuttgart-Schalke 04 1–1
 1–0 Marcelo Bordon (34)
 1–1 Tomasz Hajto (86 pen)
 Borussia Dortmund-Schalke 04 1–1
 0–1 Victor Agali (69)
 1–1 Ewerthon (70)
 Schalke 04-Mönchengladbach 2–1
 1–0 Christian Poulsen (15)
 1–1 Joris van Hout (31)
 2–1 Victor Agali (45)
 Arminia Bielefeld-Schalke 04 2–1
 1–0 Erhan Albayrak (7 pen)
 1–1 Gustavo Varela (20 pen)
 2–1 Mamadou Diabang (68)
 Schalke 04-Hamburg 3–0
 1–0 Victor Agali (9)
 2–0 Ebbe Sand (15)
 3–0 Gerald Asamoah (45)
 1860 Munich-Schalke 04 3–0
 1–0 Benjamin Lauth (60)
 2–0 Benjamin Lauth (76)
 3–0 Markus Schroth (80)
 Schalke 04–Nürnberg 1–1
 0–1 Saša Ćirić (12)
 1–1 Sven Vermant (90)
 Energie Cottbus-Schalke 04 0–1
 0–1 Andreas Möller (80)
 Schalke 04-Bayer Leverkusen 0–1
 0–1 Bernd Schneider (90 pen)
 Bochum-Schalke 04 0–2
 0–1 Andreas Möller (48)
 0–2 Gerald Asamoah (86)
 Schalke 04-Hansa Rostock 2–2
 1–0 Ebbe Sand (6)
 2–0 Émile Mpenza (39)
 2–1 Peter Wibrån (51)
 2–2 Rade Priča (86)
 Hannover-Schalke 04 0–2
 0–1 Jörg Böhme (15 pen)
 0–2 Émile Mpenza (19)
 Schalke 04-Werder Bremen 1–1
 0–1 Markus Daun (3)
 1–1 Ebbe Sand (7)
 Bayern Munich-Schalke 04 0–0
 Wolfsburg-Schalke 04 1–2
 0–1 Sven Kmetsch (47)
 0–2 Gustavo Varela (51)
 1–2 Tomislav Marić (71)
 Schalke 04–Kaiserslautern 2–2
 1–0 Victor Agali (5)
 1–1 Tomasz Klos (31)
 2–1 Victor Agali (69)
 2–2 Harry Koch (90)
 Hertha BSC-Schalke 04 4–2
 0–1 Émile Mpenza (1)
 1–1 Michael Preetz (28)
 2–1 Alex Alves (39)
 3–1 Gustavo Varela (48 og)
 3–2 Niels Oude Kamphuis (78)
 4–2 Marcelinho (88)
 Schalke 04-Stuttgart 2–0
 1–0 Émile Mpenza (3)
 2–0 Tomasz Hajto (45)
 Schalke 04-Borussia Dortmund 2–2
 1–0 Sven Vermant (13)
 2–0 Nico van Kerckhoven (16)
 2–1 Jan Koller (52)
 2–2 Ewerthon (58)
 Mönchengladbach-Schalke 04 2–2
 0–1 Tomasz Wałdoch (26)
 1–1 Peer Kluge (57)
 1–2 Tomasz Hajto (64)
 2–2 Igor Demo (69)
 Schalke 04-Arminia Bielefeld 1–1
 0–1 Bastian Reinhardt (57)
 1–1 Sven Vermant (89)
 Hamburg-Schalke 04 3–1
 1–0 Bernardo Romeo (29)
 1–1 Marco van Hoogdalem (57)
 2–1 Naohiro Takahara (86)
 3–1 Bernardo Romeo (90)
 Schalke 04-1860 Munich 1–1
 1–0 Émile Mpenza (38)
 1–1 Marco van Hoogdalem (43 og)
 Nürnberg-Schalke 04 0–0
 Schalke 04-Energie Cottbus 3–0
 1–0 Jörg Böhme (45 pen)
 2–0 Ebbe Sand (54)
 3–0 Jörg Böhme (61)
 Bayer Leverkusen-Schalke 04 1–3
 1–0 Dimitar Berbatov (9)
 1–1 Jörg Böhme (12)
 1–2 Ebbe Sand (61)
 1–3 Gerald Asamoah (90)
 Schalke 04-Bochum 1–2
 0–1 Thomas Christiansen (24)
 1–1 Gustavo Varela (29)
 1–2 Delron Buckley (89)
 Hansa Rostock-Schalke 04 3–1
 0–1 Gustavo Varela (16)
 1–1 Rade Priča (65)
 2–1 Magnus Arvidsson (79)
 3–1 René Rydlewicz (84)
 Schalke 04-Hannover 0–2
 0–1 Nebojša Krupniković (60)
 0–2 Jiří Štajner (73)
 Werder Bremen-Schalke 04 2–1
 1–0 Angelos Charisteas (22)
 1–1 Victor Agali (36)
 2–1 Johan Micoud (57)
 Schalke 04-Bayern Munich 1–0
 1–0 Niels Oude Kamphuis (38)

Topscorers
  Victor Agali 7
  Ebbe Sand 6
  Jörg Böhme 5
  Émile Mpenza 5

References

FC Schalke 04 seasons
Schalke 04